Misty is a 2018 play by Arinzé Kene. 
Directed by Omar Elerian, the piece opened at the Bush Theatre, London with an opening night on 21 March 2018, following previews from 15 March. The production closed on 21 April 2018
With the support of Luti Media, the production transferred to the Trafalgar Studios in the West End, opening on 8 September 2018. It was initially scheduled to play until 20 October, but extended its run to 17 November 2018.

Awards and nominations

Original London production

References

External links 
 Bush Theatre Listing

2018 plays
West End plays